Habsburg-occupied Serbia refers to the period between 1686 and 1699 of the Great Turkish War, during which various regions of present-day Serbia (which were de jure Ottoman territory) were occupied by the Habsburg monarchy. In those regions, Habsburg authorities have established various forms of provisional military administration, including the newly organized Serbian Militia. By the Treaty of Karlowitz in 1699, some of those regions remained under the permanent Habsburg rule, while others were returned to the Ottoman Empire.

History

In 1683, the Great Vienna War broke out between the Ottoman Empire and the Habsburg monarchy. After the victory in the Siege of Buda (1686), Habsburg forces continued their advance towards south, forcing Ottomans to retreat from the Kingdom of Hungary and neighboring regions. In the same time, local Serbs, who were Christians, formed the Serbian Militia and joined with Habsburg forces against Ottomans, driving them out (fully or partially) from regions of Bačka, Banat and Syrmia (corresponding to modern Vojvodina, in Serbia).

In 1688, the Habsburg forces organized a further offensive towards south, crossing rivers Sava and Danube. In the same time, the Serbian Militia operated throughout regions of Šumadija and Raška in central Serbia. After the victory in the Siege of Belgrade (1688), Habsburg forces continued their advance towards south, taking Niš and reaching Prizren and Skopje (1689). The Habsburgs were warmly welcomed by the locals as they saw the Christian troops as liberators. When Enea Silvio Piccolomini arrived in Prizren, roughly 5,000 Albanians, with their Archbishop, Pjetër Bogdani, greeted him with salvoes of gunfire. Also about 5,000 Muslim Albanians in Pristina who had risen against the Turks had given to understand that they would submit to the rule of the Habsburgs. The same time, Serbian Patriarch Arsenije III Crnojević also sided with Habsburgs. Piccolomini thus had over 20,000 Albanians and Serbs under his orders. By the beginning of 1690, Habsburg-controlled area included much of the territory of present-day Serbia. 

In 1690, a full-scale Ottoman counter-offensive was launched, forcing Habsburg commanders and the Serbian Militia to retreat to the north. Ottoman atrocities provoked the Great Migration of the Serbs, led by Serbian Patriarch Arsenije III, who left the Patriarchal Monastery of Peć, and presided an Assembly of Serbian leaders, who met in Belgrade in 1690 and elected Emperor Leopold I as King of Serbia. Ottomans undertook the Siege of Belgrade (1690) and recaptured the city, but were stopped at the Battle of Slankamen (1691) in Syrmia. 

In 1693, Habsburg forces decided to recapture Belgrade. Imperial army, led by duke Charles Eugène de Croÿ, attacked the city and laid the siege, but Ottoman garrison organized a successful resistance and managed to repel the attack. During next few years, Ottomans made several attempts to recapture regions of Syrmia and Bačka, but were finally defeated at the Battle of Senta (1697) (modern Senta, in northern Serbia).  

The Habsburg withdrawal from the southern territories of present-day Serbia ran in parallel with the Great Serbian Migrations into the northern regions, remaining within the Habsburg monarchy. The war ended with the Treaty of Karlowitz in 1699 (signed in Sremski Karlovci in present-day northern Serbia), under which the territory of present-day Serbia was divided between the Ottoman Empire and the Habsburg Monarchy. According to the Treaty, most of the territory of present-day Serbia remained within the Ottoman Empire, while the region of Bačka and part of the region of Syrmia were assigned to the Habsburg Monarchy.

Habsburg commanders
The main Habsburg commanders in charge of operations on the territory of present-day Serbia were:
 Ludwig Wilhelm von Baden (1655-1707)
 Giovanni Norberto Piccolomini (1640–1689)
 Charles Eugène de Croÿ (1651-1702)

See also
 Holy League (1684)
 Kingdom of Serbia (1718–1739)
 Habsburg-occupied Serbia (1788–1792)
 Serbian Vojvodina

References

Sources

 
 
 
 
  
 
 
 
 

Great Turkish War
17th century in Serbia
Serbia under Habsburg rule
History of Bačka
History of Syrmia
Habsburg Serbs
Occupation of Serbia